The Oaks may refer to:

Places

Australia 
 The Oaks, New South Wales, a small town near Sydney

United Kingdom 
 The Oaks, Ascot, an 18th-century country mansion later renamed the Royal Berkshire

 The Oaks railway station, Bromley Cross, Lancashire

United States

Alabama
 The Oaks (Tuscumbia, Alabama), listed on the National Register of Historic Places in Colbert County, Alabama
 The Oaks (Tuskegee University) at Tuskegee University, the house of Booker T. Washington, listed on the National Register of Historic Places

California
 The Oaks, Los Angeles County, California, a place in California
 The Oaks (Monrovia, California), also known as William N. Monroe House, in Los Angeles County
 The Oaks, Mendocino County, California, an unincorporated community
 The Oaks, Nevada County, California, a neighborhood or community
 The Oaks (Thousand Oaks, California), a regional shopping mall located in Thousand Oaks, California

Florida
 The Oaks Mall, a mall in Gainesville, Florida

Louisiana
 The Oaks (Hardwood, Louisiana), listed on the listed on the NRHP in West Feliciana Parish, Louisiana
 The Oaks (Keachi, Louisiana), listed on the National Register of Historic Places listings in De Soto Parish, Louisiana

Mississippi
 The Oaks House Museum, in Jackson, also known as The Oaks

New Jersey
 The Oaks Historic District (Merchantville, New Jersey), listed on the National Register of Historic Places listings in Camden County, New Jersey

South Carolina
 The Oaks (Coronaca, South Carolina), listed on the NRHP in Greenwood County, South Carolina
 The Oaks (Frogmore, South Carolina), listed on the NRHP in Beaufort County, South Carolina
 The Oaks (Winnsboro, South Carolina), listed on the NRHP in Fairfield County, South Carolina

Virginia
 The Oaks (Christiansburg, Virginia), listed on the NRHP in Montgomery County, Virginia
 The Oaks (Kents Store, Virginia), listed on the NRHP in Fluvanna County, Virginia
 The Oaks (Staunton, Virginia), listed on the NRHP in Staunton, Virginia
 The Oaks (Warrenton, Virginia), listed on the NRHP in Fauquier County, Virginia\

Sports

Horse races
 Cheshire Oaks (horse race), at Chester Racecourse, England
 Epsom Oaks (officially The Oaks Stakes), at Epsom Downs Racecourse in Epsom, Surrey, England
 Kentucky Oaks, at Churchill Downs in Louisville, Kentucky
 Irish Oaks, at Curragh Racecourse in County Kildare, Ireland
 Lancashire Oaks, at Haydock Park Racecourse, Merseyside, England
 Yorkshire Oaks, at York Racecourse, England

Other sports
 Oaks (greyhounds), a greyhound race at Belle Vue Stadium in Manchester, England
 Romania national rugby union team, nicknamed Stejarii (The Oaks)

Other uses 
 The OaKs (band), a band from Orlando, Florida
 The Oaks (TV series), a Fox television show
 The Oak Ridge Boys, a Country/ Gospel quartet

See also 
 Oak (disambiguation)
 Oaks (disambiguation)
 Thousand Oaks (disambiguation)